The John Simon Guggenheim Memorial Foundation was founded in 1925 by Olga and Simon Guggenheim in memory of their son, who died on April 26, 1922. The organization awards Guggenheim Fellowships to professionals who have demonstrated exceptional ability by publishing a significant body of work in the fields of natural sciences, social sciences, humanities, and the creative arts, excluding the performing arts.

References

External links
John Simon Guggenheim Memorial Foundation
Extracts from Simon Guggenheim's letters of gift to the Foundation

Foundations based in the United States
Guggenheim family
Arts foundations based in the United States
 
Organizations established in 1925
1925 establishments in the United States

de:Guggenheim-Stipendium